"Misery" is a song by American band Maroon 5. It was released on June 22, 2010 by A&M Octone Records, as the lead single from their third studio album Hands All Over (2010). The song has been compared to the band's previous worldwide hit, "This Love".

Background and writing 
Written by Adam Levine, Jesse Carmichael, and Sam Farrar, the song is about the narrator finding himself in a difficult situation when a relationship fades. "Why won't you answer me? / The silence is slowly killing me / Girl you really got me bad," he states in the lyrics. The song documents the decay of a relationship, familiar territory for the band. Frontman, Levine told MTV News: "'Misery' is about the desperation of wanting someone really badly in your life but having it be very difficult. Kind of what all the songs I write are about. I'm not treading on new ground, but I think a lot of people – including myself – deal with that all the time. Relationships are difficult, and it's good therapy to write about them."

Critical reception 
The song received positive reviews from music critics. Bill Lamb from About.com, while reviewing the single, awarded it with the maximum of stars (5 out of 5), saying: "All of the usual elements of a Maroon 5 hit are here, from the perky pop-soul sound to lyrics of intense conflict in a relationship. However, this time the band takes it all a few steps forward into the category of pop perfection. Quite possibly a key reason for this step forward is the presence of the by now legendary Robert John 'Mutt' Lange in the producers chair. 'Misery' is instantly the best mainstream pop single of 2010 so far."

MTV Buzzworthy stated that the single was "pretty classic Maroon 5", and "a buoyant, poppy affair that has a dark underbelly." AOL Radio stated that it was a "falsetto-pleading, yet upbeat, keyboard-popping track" with a chorus similar to Maroon 5's 2004 single "This Love". The New York Post stated that the single was "exactly the kind of up tempo, falsetto-filled single we've come to expect".  Rolling Stone reviewers called the song a "funk-rock singalong" that "some people might have a hard time picking out... from a police line-up of Maroon 5 songs."

Music video

Background 
The video was filmed in May 2010. Levine stated to MTV News that the song's music video, directed by Joseph Kahn, focuses on violence, rather than sex, where the female decides to assault, assassinate, kill, rape, maim, humiliate, injure, and bruise her own significant other. The music video stars Russian model Anne Vyalitsyna (Levine's girlfriend at the time). The various members of the band appear as bystanders or passersby who get variously hit by cars, etc., as they wind up becoming casualties of the female lead's violence towards Levine's character. The video premiered on July 1, 2010 on MTV and VH1. The UK version of the video was released on August 11, 2010, also co-directed by Kahn with Don Tyler did with the animation. Tyler would later direct with the band's "Hands All Over" music video. This version censored the majority of the violence with cartoon-like graphics, and adds shots of the band (wearing the same outfits as they do in the rest of the video).

Levine told MTV News about the Joseph Kahn-directed video. "The cool thing is, when Joseph wrote the treatment after reading a few sentences, I thought it was really amazing," he said. "Because it kind of turns the whole idea of the sexual energy between two people – a guy and a girl, a music video, you've seen that a million times – that exists in this video, but it's turning it on its ass and having the girl be the more domineering one who's trying to kill me." Levine admitted to MTV News: "I'll tell you a little secret... the stuntmen were so great, but they probably weren't too happy because they had to dress like us for the video, which was hilarious, because we aren't the most masculine dressers. This dude who was keyboardist Jesse Carmichael's stunt double was, like, really buff, and he has Jesse's little low-top Converse and skinny jeans on. The shoes were, like, falling off his massive ankles."

Levine added: "I did a lot of stuff, a lot of stuff is me! But most of it wasn't very dangerous. Although, by the end of the day, even not being hit by things is such a physical thing that I was really kind of beat up. I was like, 'Man, even thinking I got my ass kicked feels like getting my ass kicked.'"

Reception 
Robbie Daw from Idolator called director Joseph Kahn a "visual maestro". MTV Buzzworthy also reviewed the video positively, saying: "Adam Levine and model Anne Vyalitsyna make a love-hate relationship look so sexy in Maroon 5's new video, "Misery".

Live performances 
On July 1, 2010, Maroon 5 performed "Misery" for the first time at the Empire Hotel in New York City, as part of the Vevo Summer Sets concert series. On July 2, the band performed the track on The Today Show, at Rockefeller Plaza in New York. The band continued with the song in MTV's The Summer Song concert in Naples, Italy, on September 18, 2010. In September 2010, Maroon 5 also played "Misery" live during their appearances on Live from Studio Five, Late Show with David Letterman, The Ellen DeGeneres Show and Jimmy Kimmel Live!, respectively. The band performed the song for a special concert with the launch of Windows Phone 7, at the AT&T Store in The Fillmore, San Francisco on November 8, 2010. They played with the song in at home performance of Live @ Home in December 2010. "Misery" was also performed for the band's concert tours, Palm Trees & Power Lines Tour and the Hands All Over Tour.

Awards and nominations

Track listing 
Digital download
 "Misery" – 3:36

Germany commercial single
 "Misery" – 3:36
 "Through with You" (Live) – 3:20

Digital download – Misery remixes singles
 "Misery" (Diplo Put Me Out Of My Misery Mix) – 4:26  
 "Misery" (The Elements Remix) – 3:32

Remixes EP
 "Misery" (Bimbo Jones Club Mix) – 4:14
 "Misery" (Bimbo Jones Radio Edit) – 2:57
 "Misery" (Bimbo Jones Dub Mix) – 7:24
 "Misery" (Cutmore Got Da Funk Mix) – 5:41 
 "Misery" (Cutmore Radio Edit) – 3:38
 "Misery" (Cutmore Dub Mix) – 6:26

Charts and certifications

Weekly charts

Year-end charts

Certifications

Release history

References 

2010 singles
Maroon 5 songs
Song recordings produced by Robert John "Mutt" Lange
Songs written by Adam Levine
Songs written by Jesse Carmichael
Record Report Pop Rock General number-one singles
Music videos directed by Joseph Kahn
Songs written by Sam Farrar
Torch songs
Songs about loneliness
2010 songs
A&M Octone Records singles
Songs based on actual events
Funk rock songs